Clay County School District is a school district in Clay County, Alabama.

Schools
 Central High School of Clay County (Lineville)
 Central Junior High School (Lineville)
 Lineville Elementary School (Lineville)
 Ashland Elementary School (Ashland)

External links
 

School districts in Alabama
Clay County, Alabama